Fencing events at the 1987 Southeast Asian Games was held between 10 September to 15 September at Hall A Senayan.

Medal summary

Men

Women's

Medal table

References
 http://eresources.nlb.gov.sg/newspapers/Digitised/Article/straitstimes19870911-1.2.56.38
 http://eresources.nlb.gov.sg/newspapers/Digitised/Article/straitstimes19870912-1.2.44.15.15
 http://eresources.nlb.gov.sg/newspapers/Digitised/Article/straitstimes19870914-1.2.43.35
 http://eresources.nlb.gov.sg/newspapers/Digitised/Article/straitstimes19870915-1.2.50.28
 http://eresources.nlb.gov.sg/newspapers/Digitised/Article/straitstimes19870916-1.2.46.13.12

1987 Southeast Asian Games
Southeast Asian Games
1987
Fencing competitions in Indonesia